The Richardson–Ulrich House is a historic residence in Klamath Falls, Oregon, United States.

The house was listed on the National Register of Historic Places in 1988.

See also
National Register of Historic Places listings in Klamath County, Oregon

References

External links

Houses on the National Register of Historic Places in Oregon
Houses completed in 1910
National Register of Historic Places in Klamath County, Oregon
Houses in Klamath County, Oregon
1885 establishments in Oregon